Mark Anthony Battles (born September 2, 1991) is an American rapper, songwriter, entrepreneur and producer from Indianapolis, Indiana. Battles is the founder of Fly America, an independent hip hop record label.

In 2012, Battles released his first mixtape Walking Distance and gained online recognition for his song "Last Night", which placed second on MTVu and was later remixed by Kid Ink. He has worked closely with Wale, Dizzy Wright, French Montana and Kevin Gates, overall releasing a dozen mixtapes including a collaboration project with Tory Lanez and King Los, surpassing a million digital downloads.

In October 2015, Battles released his first independent album Numb, which peaked at #25 on the Billboard Top R&B/Hip-Hop and Heatseeker charts. In 2016, Battles was named alongside Kendrick Lamar and YG in 5 Influential Rappers On Mental Health Stigma by The Huffington Post. In 2017 Battles released a project titled “Day 2” which featured artists such as Brittani Jenae and Tory Lanez. The following year in 2018, Battles released a project titled “Vasi World” that he admits was not his best effort despite overwhelming positive feedback. Most recently he has released a project titled “Fortunate” which consists of zero features and his second most commercially successful song, “Numb.”

Early life 

Mark Anthony Battles was born on September 2, 1991 in Indianapolis, Indiana. His mother is Chiffonda Ducking. He has 2 brothers named Anthony and Carl, and one sister. Battles and his siblings were raised in the urban, poor communities of Indianapolis, having lived in several homeless shelters during the early part of his childhood. However, it wasn't until he began high school that things got a bit better for his mother.

He began rapping under a different stage name before using his current rap name. He graduated as Class of 2009 from Pike High School located in northern Indianapolis. His inspiration for music originated from hip hop icons such as Big Pun, Drake, Eminem and 2Pac.

On August 31, 2006, his brother Carl Battles was riding the backseat of his sister Aishareika's car to school. In the morning hours, Aishareika's car collided with a pick up truck on Northwestern Side near 71st street near their school Pike High School. Carl, Aishareika and Mark were rushed to the hospital, however shortly after arriving at the hospital, Carl was pronounced dead. Local media reports state that both cars were speeding on a yellow light, and as a result of the accident prompted the roads near the school to be enforced with speed cameras.

In several songs performed by Battles, including "One For The Money", he mentions and pays tribute to his brother Carl. His brother Carl was, according to Battles, the reason for his motivation to pursue a music career.

Musical career

2011–2012: Career beginnings 

Mark started rapping officially at age 15. Mark started his own independent record label called Fly America in 2011, which is a brand that is heard throughout his music. In 2012, Mark released his first mixtape called Walking Distance with appearances by Kid Ink, Lola Monroe and King Los. Walking Distance went on to be certified gold on DatPiff, having over 100,000 digital downloads. Mark's music video single Last Night was remixed by Kid Ink and was released without a music video. Most of the material in the mixtape was produced by Mark's DJ & producer, DJ Yung 1. Mark's most famous singles were "Ugh Oh" featuring Los, and Last Night, which was featured on MTVu Freshman and hit second place for air time on MTV.

Mark has remixed numerous famous hip hop songs which have appeared on his mixtapes. On November 2012, Mark released the first part of his mixtape series Saturday School. In 2012, Mark Battles went on tour with MMG recording artist Rockie Fresh.

2013–2015: Mixtape Series & Numb 

In 2013, Battles released his 3 part Saturday School mixtape series, along with a national tour that included a sold-out show alongside Bad Boy rapper MGK. On December 27, 2013, he released his collaboration mixtape with King Los. The mixtape Broken Silence was released in 2013 and artists featured include Wale, Curren$y, Ab-Soul, French Montana, Dizzy Wright, Cyhi Da Prynce and Chevy Woods. The first single was released titled "Got A Feeling" which featured Wale and former Fly America rapper Derek Luh. On August 12, 2014 Battles released another mixtape titled "Preseason".

On October 2, 2015, Battles released his debut studio album "Numb", which was released independently on iTunes. The album peaked at #25 on the U.S. Billboard Heatseekers charts and reached #39 on the Billboard R&B/Hip-Hop charts.

2016-2017: Before The Deal & Day 2 

On May 13, 2016, Battles announced on his Twitter account a partnership deal with iconic music producer No ID's record label ARTium Recordings, a division of Def Jam Records. The deal came after the release of a dozen musical projects and national tours, respectively. Shortly after, Battles announced his latest musical project "Before The Deal" and released a music video for the single "No Love" featuring Futuristic and King Los.

On May 31, 2016, Battles released his second studio album "Before the Deal", for digital release. Within a couple of hours after its release, Before the Deal topped at #8 on the Top Rap album iTunes charts. On the week of June 18, 2016, Before the Deal debuted on Billboard's Top Heatseekers charts at #15. A nationwide tour was announced called "The Before The Deal Tour", which began in June 2016. Throughout 2016, Battles has collaborated with several recording artists including Dizzy Wright, Audio Push and Locksmith. In Summer of 2016, Mark Battles became one of three artists as part of Dizzy Wright's "Still Movin" tour with Audio Push.

In September 2016, Battles collaborated with fellow Indianapolis native Dorian for the official remix of Dorian's hit single "Don't Sleep".

In November 2016, Battles was interviewed by XXL magazine, in which he stated he described his relationship with producer NO I.D. as "The new kid on the block." After the radio interview, several hip hop artists including Nebraska rapper HAKIM, expressed their inspiration for Battles' comeup.

On May 26 of 2017, in collaboration with Quality Control Music founder Coach K, Battles released a studio album with Tory Lanez called Day 2, which received mainstream radio airplay in the US.

2018-present: Vasi World EP 

On February 9, 2018, Battles released his Vasi World EP with Fly America and Quality Control Music. The following month, he announced the Vasi World Spring Tour featuring DJ Yung 1, T.Fitz, 12Fifteen, and King Kap.

Fly America 

Fly America (FA) is an American independent hip-hop record company founded by Mark Battles, the label's landmark recording artist. In 2016, Battles announced a partnership deal with No ID's imprint ARTium Recordings, a part of Def Jam Records; however, in 2017, Battles formed a partnership with Atlanta music manager Coach K. Since its creation, in 2011, former hip hop recording artist Derek Luh, Jace Houston, King Kap, Brittani Jenae, and DJ Yung 1 have been signed to Fly America.

Current artists 
 Mark Battles
 12Fifteen
 Brittani Jenae
 DJ Yung 1 (DJ/Producer)

Former artists 
 Derek Luh
 Jace Houston

Discography

Studio albums 

 Day 2 (2017)

Mixtapes 

 Good Morning America (2011)
 Walking Distance (2012)
 Saturday School (2011) 
 Saturday School 2 (2012)
 Saturday School 3 (2012)
 Broken Silence (2013)
 Black Einstein (2014)
 Preseason (2014) 
 Lost In Reality (2015) (with Dizzy Wright and Euroz)
 Shelter Food (2015)
 Until September (2015)
 Vasi World (2018)
 Foturnate (2018)
 Fortunate2 (2019)

Tours

See also 
 Hip hop music

References

External links 
 Official Website
 Twitter
 Facebook

1991 births
Living people
Record producers from Indiana
Musicians from Indianapolis
Businesspeople from Indianapolis
Songwriters from Indiana
African-American male rappers
American male rappers
Rappers from Indiana
21st-century American businesspeople
American hip hop singers
Midwest hip hop musicians
African-American record producers
21st-century American rappers
21st-century American male musicians
African-American songwriters
21st-century African-American musicians
American male songwriters